Carl Thomas (born October 3, 1969) is American former professional basketball player who played in the National Basketball Association (NBA). He is currently an assistant coach at Duquesne University.

Though born in Dayton, Ohio, Thomas moved to Lansing, Michigan where he played basketball at Everett High School. He went on to college at Eastern Michigan University, where he also played basketball.

Thomas began his NBA career with the Sacramento Kings in 1991–92, playing one game, playing 31 minutes, scoring 12 points. He did not return to the league until 1996–97, when he joined the Cleveland Cavaliers. His final NBA season in 1997–98 was split between the Golden State Warriors, Orlando Magic, and the Cavaliers (for a second stint).

Thomas last played professionally with an Italian team, Fileni Jesi. He is the twin brother of former Detroit Pistons player Charles Thomas.

Thomas took a position as head of the Jackson College basketball program in 2013. He previously worked as an assistant basketball coach at Eastern Michigan University.

See also
 List of NCAA Division I men's basketball players with 11 or more steals in a game

References

External links
NBA stats @ Basketballreference.com
Basketpedya.com Profile

1969 births
Living people
African-American basketball players
American expatriate basketball people in the Dominican Republic
American expatriate basketball people in France
American expatriate basketball people in Greece
American expatriate basketball people in Italy
American expatriate basketball people in Spain
American expatriate basketball people in Sweden
American men's basketball coaches
American men's basketball players
Basketball coaches from Michigan
Basketball coaches from Ohio
Basketball players at the 1995 Pan American Games
Basketball players at the 1999 Pan American Games
Basketball players from Michigan
Basketball players from Dayton, Ohio
Cleveland Cavaliers players
College men's basketball head coaches in the United States
Duquesne Dukes men's basketball coaches
Eastern Michigan Eagles men's basketball coaches
Eastern Michigan Eagles men's basketball players
Fort Wayne Fury players
Golden State Warriors players
Grand Rapids Hoops players
Grand Rapids Mackers players
Ionikos N.F. B.C. players
Irakleio B.C. players
Junior college men's basketball coaches in the United States
Liga ACB players
Limoges CSP players
Maryland Eastern Shore Hawks men's basketball coaches
Orlando Magic players
Pan American Games medalists in basketball
Pan American Games silver medalists for the United States
Sacramento Kings players
Shooting guards
Sportspeople from Lansing, Michigan
Undrafted National Basketball Association players
Medalists at the 1995 Pan American Games
Medalists at the 1999 Pan American Games
American expatriate basketball people in the Philippines
Philippine Basketball Association imports
Pop Cola Panthers players
21st-century African-American people
20th-century African-American sportspeople